Gabungan Sepak Bola Barru (simply known as Gasbar Barru) is an Indonesian football club based in Barru Regency, South Sulawesi. They currently compete in the Liga 3.

Sponsorship
 Abustan Foundation (2021–)
 Bank Sulselbar (2021–)
 Bosowa Semen (2021–)
 Al-Barrur (2021–)

References

Sport in South Sulawesi
Football clubs in Indonesia
Football clubs in South Sulawesi
Association football clubs established in 1960
1960 establishments in Indonesia